David Joseph Levac  (born April 6, 1954) is a retired Canadian politician who was the 41st speaker of the Legislative Assembly of Ontario from 2011 to 2018. Levac was elected to the Legislative Assembly in 1999 as a member of the Ontario Liberal Party. He served as the member of Provincial Parliament (MPP) for Brant until 2018 and is the Ontario legislature's longest serving speaker.

Background
Born in Brantford, Ontario, Levac attended Wilfrid Laurier University, where he earned a Bachelor of Arts in 1976. He completed teacher's college at Queen's University in 1977, beginning to work a teacher in the early 1980s, and became a principal in Brantford in 1989. In 1992, he attended Niagara University to complete a master's degree in education. Levac received the Canada 125 Medal in 1993, was named OECTA Distinguished Teacher in 1994 for his work in conflict resolution programs, and was named Brantford's Citizen of the Year in 1997 by readers of the Brantford Expositor. He also served as co-ordinator of Queen Elizabeth II's Royal Visit to Brantford in 1997. He was awarded the Queen Elizabeth II Golden Jubilee Medal in 2002. In 2011 he was awarded the Chevalier of the Order of Merit for his educational efforts with respect to the Ukrainian famine in the 1930s.

Political career
Levac was elected in the 1999 provincial election, defeating Progressive Conservative (PC) candidate Alayne Sokoloski by 956 votes in the riding of Brant. The PCs won a majority government in this election, and Levac sat as an opposition member for the next four years.

The Liberals won a majority government in the 2003 provincial election and Levac again defeated Sokoloski, this time by over 10,000 votes. Levac was named chief government whip. Levac was re-elected in 2007, 2011, and 2014.

On April 9, 2009 Levac, along with co-sponsors Cheri DiNovo and Frank Klees passed bill 147 – the Holodomor Memorial Day Act. This was the first piece of legislation in Ontario history to be introduced with tri-partisan sponsorship. This historic legislation recognizes Ukrainian man-made famine as an act of Genocide.

On January 25, 2010, Levac was named parliamentary assistant to the minister of energy and infrastructure.

After the 2011 election, Levac was elected Speaker of the Legislative Assembly of Ontario. He beat three other Liberal members, David Zimmer, Kevin Flynn, and Donna Cansfield. Cansfield was an early favourite for the position but lost to Levac on a second ballot after the New Democratic Party (NDP) voted in a bloc for Levac. No NDP or PC members put their names forward due to the Liberal government's delicate one-seat minority status in the legislature. Levac was re-elected as speaker after the 2014 election defeating four other contenders.

On May 5, 2017, Levac announced he would not run for his seat again in the 2018 Ontario general election after 19 years in the legislature and seven of those years as speaker.

In 2022, Levac was appointed to the Order of Ontario.

Electoral record

References

External links

1954 births
21st-century Canadian politicians
Heads of schools in Canada
Chevaliers of the Order of Merit (Ukraine)
Living people
Métis politicians 
Niagara University alumni
Ontario Liberal Party MPPs
Politicians from Brantford
Speakers of the Legislative Assembly of Ontario